Sir William D'Oyly, 1st Baronet (ca. 1614 – November 1677) was an English politician who sat in the House of Commons variously between 1654 and 1677.

D'Oyly was the son of William D'Oyly. He succeeded to the estates of his uncle Henry, and was known as Sir William, the elder. As heir to Susan D'Oyly, his cousin, he came into possession of Pond-hall (Hadleigh), Topsfield, and Cossford, in Suffolk, and Shottisham (now more generally spelled Shotesham), Gostlings, and three manors in Warham, in Norfolk. He was serving abroad in the army of Gustavus Adolphus of Sweden, and remained abroad after Gustavus Adolphus's death until he returned to take possession of the family fortune. He was knighted by King Charles I in 1642, for his gallant behaviour.

In 1654, D'Oyly was elected Member of Parliament for Norfolk in the First Protectorate Parliament. He was re-elected MP for Norfolk in 1656 for the Second Protectorate Parliament and in 1659 for the Third Protectorate Parliament.

In 1660, D'Oyly was elected Member of Parliament for Great Yarmouth in the Convention Parliament. He was among the most zealous in the convention parliament, for the restoration of the royal family. He was a very accomplished gentleman, and much esteemed in his county.  He was one of the commissioners appointed by the House of Commons, to see the army disbanded, in 1661, and was chosen by the city of Norwich, with Sir Horatio Townsend, Sir John Holland, and Sir Ralph Hare, to wait on the King, soon after his return with the resignation of the charter which the king restored. He was re-elected MP for Great Yarmouth in 1661 for the Cavalier Parliament and sat until his death in 1677.  In 1663, he was created a baronet, of Shottisham.

D'Oyly married  Margaret Randall of Pulham,  Norfolk. They had six daughters and three sons. He was succeeded in the baronetcy by his son William.

References

1614 births
1677 deaths
William
English MPs 1654–1655
English MPs 1656–1658
English MPs 1659
English MPs 1660
English MPs 1661–1679
Baronets in the Baronetage of England
Members of the Parliament of England for Norfolk